Brigadier General Nicolas J-L Pilon ,  is a Canadian Army officer who has served as the Commandant of RMC Saint-Jean since August 9, 2019. Previously he served as the Commanding Officer of the 2nd Combat Engineer Regiment and served in Haiti as Chief of Staff of the United Nations Military Forces on the MINUSTAH Stabilization Mission. Due to his efforts in the MINUSTAH Stabilization Mission he was awarded the Meritorious Service Medal.

Biography
Nicolas J-L Pilon graduated with a bachelor's degree in Civil Engineering from the Royal Military College of Canada (RMC) in Kingston Ontario in 1996. He later obtained a Masters in Defense Studies from RMC and completed the Strategic Security and Defense Studies course from the Royal College of Defense Studies. He was promoted to the rank of Brigadier General on 13 May 2021 and appointed the Director General Defence Force Planning.

References 

Year of birth missing (living people)
Living people
Canadian generals
Recipients of the Meritorious Service Decoration
Royal Military College of Canada alumni
Canadian military personnel of the War in Afghanistan (2001–2021)